Samoa competed at the 2010 Commonwealth Games in Delhi, India winning three gold medals and one bronze.

Medalists

Among other sports, Samoa competed in rugby sevens. Samoa is the top seed in pool C, where it will face Kenya, Malaysia and Papua New Guinea.

See also
 Samoa at the 2006 Commonwealth Games

References

2010
Nations at the 2010 Commonwealth Games
Commonwealth Games